Stephan Widmer is a swimming coach for the Commercial Swimming Club and the Australian swimming team.

Of German-Swiss origin, Widmer moved to Australia and succeeded Scott Volkers as the head coach at CSC, which had produced a long line of Australian representatives, including World Champions Susie O'Neill and Samantha Riley.

Notable students 
Leisel Jones (2004–2007)
Kylie Palmer
Jessicah Schipper (2008–)
Melanie Schlanger
Libby Trickett ( –2008)
Christian Sprenger
Tarnee White

References 

Year of birth missing (living people)
Living people
Australian swimming coaches
Australian Olympic coaches